The Mondial Loto-Québec de Laval, also known as Mondial Choral, or Mondial Choral Loto-Québec (up to 2011) is a summer festival occurring in Laval, Quebec, Canada which takes place annually since 2005. The main sponsor of this occasion is Loto-Québec and Grégory Charles is the Art-Director and president.

History
The festival first took place in Laval in June 2005. With more than 500.000 spectators, nearly 12.000 chorus-singers, hundreds of artists, more than 300 performances choral societies, the Mondial Choral is one of the largest gatherings of choruses in the world.

Each year, multiple events take place simultaneously. Indoor activities are mostly national and international Vocal ensemble and choirs competitions. Groups present their musical work in different Laval venues, churches and chapels.

Along with performers, celebrities such as Grégory Charles, Jireh and the Montreal Symphony Orchestra also perform in interior Concert Halls and marquees.

The free outdoor events usually take place for the Fête nationale du Québec on a large stage at the Centre de la nature. They include performers such as (in 2007) Malajube, Loco Locass, Mes Aïeux, Gilles Vigneault, Les Trois Accords; (in 2006) Robert Charlebois and Les Cowboys Fringants.

Mondial Choral won both first prizes of the "Grands prix du tourisme Québecois" in "Tourist festivals and events, Operating budget of 1 M$ or more" national category as well as "Price of the Company of the casinos of Quebec Tourist attraction – 100.000 visitors or more" regional category.

In 2010, progressive rock band Yes performed at the festival. New major rock shows were added to the program in 2012 as a result of a recent partnership with Evenko. Sarah McLachlan, LMFAO and Aerosmith are among the guests this upcoming year.

Sites

Mondial Choral offers concerts and performances through the city of Laval.

Outdoor:
 Centre de la Nature
 Laval's downtown
 Centropolis

Concert halls:
 Salle André-Mathieu
 Maison des arts
 Marcellin-Champagnat theater

Churches:

 Chapelle de la Société des Pères des Missions-Étrangères
 Chapelle des Soeurs Missionnaires de l'Immaculée-Conception
 Chapelle du Mont-de-Lasalle
 Saint Elzéar church
 Saint-François-de-Sales church
 Saint Maxime church
 Sainte Dorothée church
 Sainte Rose church

References

External links
 Official website

Music festivals established in 2005
Music festivals in Montreal
Folk festivals in Canada
Classical music festivals in Canada
Tourist attractions in Laval, Quebec